Sergey Yuryevich Kuzovlev (Russian: Сергей Юрьевич Кузовлев; born 7 January 1967) is a Russian military officer.  he holds the rank of colonel general, and commands the Southern Military District.

Biography

Sergey Kuzovlev was born in Michurinsk on 7 January 1967. He studied at school number 21 in the city of Michurinsk, Tambov Oblast, from 1974 to 1984. In 1990, he graduated from the Ryazan Higher Airborne Command School (6th company). 

He graduated from the Combined Arms Academy. From February 2005 to July 2008, he commanded the 15th Separate Motor Rifle Brigade of the Volga-Urals Military District. In May 2005, he was promoted to a colonel. In 2008 he entered the Military Academy of the General Staff,after graduating in July 2010 he was appointed commander of the 18th Separate Guards Motor Rifle Brigade. 

At the beginning of 2014, he was appointed chief of staff of the 58th Combined Arms Army of the Southern Military District, and on 22 February of the same year, he was promoted to major general.  At the end of August 2015, the Security Service of Ukraine announced that Kuzovlev had commanded the Russian forces in the Luhansk People’s Republic's 2nd Army Corps from autumn 2014 to winter 2015, during the armed conflict in eastern Ukraine. Russian sources denied that statement.

From July 2015 to August 2016, Kuzovlev was the Commander of the 20th Guards Combined Arms Army of the Western Military District. From August 2016 to January 2017, he was the Commander of the 58th Combined Arms Army of the Southern Military District. In March 2017, Kuzovlev was appointed commander of the newly formed 8th Guards Combined Arms Army of the Southern Military District. On 10 June 2017, he was awarded the military rank of lieutenant general.  In February 2019, he was appointed Chief of Staff - First Deputy Commander of the Southern Military District.

From November 2020 to February 2021, Kuzovlev was the Commander of the Group of Forces of the Armed Forces of Russia in Syria.

In June 2021, Kuzovlev became the ex officio Acting Commander of the Southern Military District. On 18 February 2021, Kuzovlev was promoted to the rank of Colonel General. On 13 December 2022, Kuzolev officially became the commander of the Western Military District.

According to Ukrainian intelligence, Kuzovlev was commander of the troops of the Western Military District for slightly more than a month, until 26 December 2022. It was announced on 23 January 2023 that Kuzovlev had been transferred to command the Southern Military District, being succeeded by Lieutenant General Yevgeny Nikiforov in the Western Military District.

References

1967 births
Living people
People from Michurinsk
Military Academy of the General Staff of the Armed Forces of Russia alumni
Ryazan Guards Higher Airborne Command School alumni
Recipients of the Order of Military Merit (Russia)
Recipients of the Medal of the Order "For Merit to the Fatherland" I class
Recipients of the Medal of the Order "For Merit to the Fatherland" II class
Russian colonel generals
Russian military personnel of the Syrian civil war